Lowbush berry may refer to:
 Lowbush blueberry, a  common name for several perennial flowering plants with blue or purple berries
 Wild lowbush blueberry, Vaccinium angustifolium
 Lowbush cranberry, a common name for several flowering plants

Berries